Frauen-Liebe und Leben (A Woman's Love and Life) is a cycle of poems by Adelbert von Chamisso, written in 1830. They describe the course of a woman's love for her man, from her point of view, from first meeting through marriage to his death, and after. Selections were set to music as a song-cycle by masters of German Lied, namely Carl Loewe (1836), Franz Lachner (c1839), and Robert Schumann (1840). The setting by Schumann (his opus 42) is now the most widely known.

Chamisso's poems
There are nine lyrics in the cycle, to which Chamisso gave the title Frauen-Liebe und Leben. It was first published in 1830, and twice in 1831 in the first editions of his poetry, and of his complete works.

Schumann in his cycle did not set the final stanza of No. 2 ('Er, der Herrlichste von allen') with its sudden change of mood. He also left out the last poem, No. 9 'Traum der eignen Tage', which is addressed to the now aged protagonist's granddaughter ("Tochter meiner Tochter"). Loewe set all nine poems in full, although only the first seven were published together.

Nomenclature
The original published titles of the poem-cycle and the song-cycles are:
 Chamisso (1830): Frauen-Liebe und Leben
 Loewe (1836): Frauenliebe
 Lachner (c1839): Frauenliebe und -leben
 Schumann (1840): Frauenliebe und Leben

The Schumann work has been edited and published several times since 1840, and all the current reliable music publishers still use the original 1840 published title, Frauenliebe und Leben, as do a majority of secondary sources discussing Schumann's song cycle.  However, Frauenliebe und -leben has been used in a minority (approximately one third) of recently published secondary sources, and also on some LP and CD covers. This latter spelling is a 'correct' style of written German using the  ergänzungsstrich (i.e. suspended or hanging dash in a list of things), although it does not accurately reflect the work's published title.

Schumann's setting

Schumann composed his setting, Frauenliebe und Leben in 1840, his "year of song" in which he wrote numerous lieder and three other complete song cycles: Liederkreis, Op. 24, Liederkreis, Op. 39 and Dichterliebe, Op. 48. There are eight poems in his cycle, together telling a story from the protagonist's first meeting her love, through their marriage, to his death. They are:

'Seit ich ihn gesehen' ("Since I saw him")
'Er, der Herrlichste von allen' ("He, the noblest of all")
'Ich kann's nicht fassen, nicht glauben' ("I cannot grasp or believe it")
'Du Ring an meinem Finger' ("You ring upon my finger")
'Helft mir, ihr Schwestern' ("Help me, sisters")
'Süßer Freund, du blickest mich verwundert an' ("Sweet friend, you gaze")
'An meinem Herzen, an meiner Brust' ("At my heart, at my breast")
'Nun hast du mir den ersten Schmerz getan' ("Now you have caused me pain for the first time")

Schumann's choice of text was very probably inspired in part by events in his personal life. He had been courting Clara Wieck, but had failed to get her father's permission to marry her. In 1840, after a legal battle to make such permission unnecessary, he finally married her.

The songs in this cycle are notable for the fact that the piano has a remarkable independence from the voice. Breaking away from the Schubertian ideal, Schumann has the piano contain the mood of the song in its totality. Another notable characteristic is the cycle's circular structure, in which the last movement repeats the theme of the first.

The composer's initial MS sketches, dated 11 July 1840, are still extant. They mostly outline the voice part on single staves, with just a few bars of piano postlude at the very end of No. 8.

Recordings 
There have been many recordings of Schumann's setting.
 
Possibly the first was that of
Julia Culp, with Otto Bake at the piano, for Odeon Records in Berlin in 1909: she later recorded it a second time. 
During the 1930s the principal versions were those of 
Lotte Lehmann (with salon orchestra accompaniment) (Parlophone-Odeon),
Germaine Martinelli accompanied by Jean Doyen in French, (Columbia Records), and 
Emmy Bettendorf made a Parlophone Records set omitting two titles. 
Lotte Lehmann made a later (wartime) recording with Bruno Walter at the piano (issued on LP by Philips Records as Minigroove ABL 3166).
Elena Gerhardt made a recording with Gerald Moore in 1947-1948, which was privately published on White Label HMV, six sides, 12", 78rpm.
Recordings by 
Astra Desmond (Decca 78rpm AK 1566-68) (with Phyllis Spurr, piano) and by 
Elisabeth Schumann with Gerald Moore. (HMV) 
are noticed in 1951. 
Kathleen Ferrier's version with John Newmark was issued on Decca Medium Play LW 5089.
Kathleen Ferrier's live recording with Bruno Walter at the Edinburgh Festival 1949, broadcast by the BBC and released in 1986 on Decca 414 611-1
Christa Ludwig, accompanied by Gerald Moore, recorded in 1959 on EMI.
Lillian 'Windsor' Winzig, recorded performance at Carnegie Hall, February 19, 1954.
Kirsten Flagstad, accompanied by Edwin McArthur appeared on HMV ALP 1191 by 1955.
Erna Berger, accompanied by - Scherzer (HMV ALP 1587) Issued 1958.
Irmgard Seefried, accompanied by Erik Werba (Deutsche-Grammophon LPEM 19112) rec. 1957.
Leontyne Price, accompanied by David Garvey, issued 1970, on RCA LSC-3169
Edith Mathis, accompanied by Christoph Eschenbach, issued 1981, on DGG LP 2562 400 in set 2740 266.

These recordings are listed on CD in 1996:
Janet Baker with Martin Isepp (Saga CD EC 3361-2), 1960s. 
Janet Baker with Daniel Barenboim (HMV LP ASD 3217), issued 1976.
Brigitte Fassbaender accompanied by Irwin Gage. (DG 439 417-2).
Anne Sofie von Otter with Bengt Forsberg. (DG DIG 445 881-2).
Sarah Connolly with Eugene Asti. (Chandos B001FENY80).
Elīna Garanča with Malcolm Martineau.  (DG 483 9210), November 2020.

Loewe's setting 

Carl Loewe's Frauenliebe, for mezzo-soprano and piano, was published as his opus 60 in 1836. He called it a Liederkranz ('wreath [or garland] of songs'), rather than a Liederkreis ('song-cycle').

Although Loewe set all nine of Chamisso's poems in September 1836, only the first seven were published together during his lifetime. No. 9, 'Traum der eignen Tage', was published separately in 1869, and No. 8 remained in MS until 1904 when it was included in the Breitkopf & Härtel complete edition of his works.

Recordings
Brigitte Fassbaender, mezzo-soprano; Cord Garben, piano (DGG DG 423 680-2)
Callista Huffman, mezzo-soprano; Giorgi Latsabidze, piano (USC NCH 511-10)

Lachner's setting 

Franz Lachner (1803–1890) made a setting entitled Frauenliebe und -leben for soprano, horn (or cello) and piano as his Op. 59 (c1839); he made another arrangement for soprano, clarinet and piano, published in 1847 as his Op. 82.

Like Schubert's Auf dem Strom, D. 943, it is part of the small repertoire of solo vocal music ensemble with horn. Lachner's youngest brother, Vincenz Lachner, wrote a song 'Waldhornruf' (Hunting horn call') for tenor, horn and piano.

Recordings
Evelyn Tubb (soprano), Lesley Schatzberger (clarinet), Richard Burnett (fortepiano) -  Classicprint CPV005CD.
Aríon Trio (Andrea Weigt, soprano; Stefan Henke, horn; Rainer Gepp, piano), Antes Edition BM CD 31.9120.

Notes

External links
 Schumann's 
 Texts of the Schumann cycle at lieder.net
 Loewe's Frauenliebe is contained in his complete 
 Text of No. 9 of the Loewe cycle at lieder.net
 Chamisso's autograph MS of No. 4, plus covers of two early Schumann editions

Song cycles by Robert Schumann
Compositions by Franz Lachner
Compositions by Carl Loewe
1840 compositions
Classical song cycles in German
Adelbert von Chamisso